Elizabeth de Burgh may refer to:

Elizabeth de Burgh (c. 1289–1327), queen of Scotland, wife of Robert the Bruce
Elizabeth de Clare (1295–1360), founder of Clare College, sister-in-law of Queen Elizabeth de Burgh
Elizabeth de Burgh, 4th Countess of Ulster (1332–1363) granddaughter of Elizabeth de Clare and grand-niece of Queen Elizabeth de Burgh